William Rainey Harper High School was a public 4–year high school located in the West Englewood neighborhood on the south side of Chicago, Illinois, United States. Opened in 1911, Harper was part of the Chicago Public Schools district. Harper served students in West Englewood and certain streets of Chicago Lawn, and was noted as the oldest high school in the West Englewood neighborhood. Harper closed at the end of the 2020–2021 school year on June 30, 2021.

History 
Opened in 1911 by the Chicago Public Schools district and Chicago Board of Education, The school was named in honor of William Rainey Harper (1856–1906), a legendary educator who served as president of both the University of Chicago and Bradley University, and who was a champion of modernizing the facilities and standardizing the academic curriculum of the Chicago Public Schools. The majority of the school's students were African-American. In 2008, Harper was the first public school in Chicago to be a part of the Turnaround project started by former Chicago Public Schools CEO Arne Duncan. Harper High School was a non-selective enrollment high school with attendance boundaries. Students within the attendance boundary were immediately enrolled without a form of admission. Those outside of the boundary had to receive permission from the school to enroll. If there are more applications than spots available, the school would perform a computerized lottery. Harper High School had form a program called "B.A.G." which the letters stands for Behavior, Attendance and Grades. Additionally, The school was adopted by BET Networks as a 100-year anniversary in 2011. Harper had won the AP School Award four times (1976–1977, 1982–1983, 2008–2009 and 2012–2013).

National attention
On April 11, 2006, Harper High School gained national attention when the school was featured on The Oprah Winfrey Show. The show discussed Harper High School's lack of computers and other essential learning tools for its students.

On July 9, 2012, Harper High School was the focus of a  2012 WBEZ report concerning the 29 past and present students who were casualties of gun violence in the preceding 13 months. The school was subsequently the subject of a two-episode, five-month immersive investigation by This American Life that aired on February 15 and 22, 2013, focusing on gun violence and the lives of students; the series earned a Peabody Award.

On April 22, 2013, two Harper senior students; Devonte Tanner and Brittney Knight, won Bill Gates Millennium Scholarships. They were the first students in Chicago school history to do so.

On October 29, 2014, School officials reported that 5 people at Harper High School in Chicago's West Englewood neighborhood were taken to different hospitals after they became ill because of the odor. Fire department officials said they have tested carbon monoxide levels in the school, but found them to be quite low. Instead, a fire department spokesman says the smell appears to be coming from sewer gas, and sanitation crews had been doing work. Students and staff were taken to other schools while the Chicago Fire Department investigated the cause of the odor. They also shut the boiler down in the school as a serious precaution.

Phasing out and closing
On February 12, 2018, the Chicago Board of Education decided to phase out and ultimately close Harper along with three other neighborhood high schools due numerous reasons including low–enrollment, poor academic performance, lack of courses offerings for students and operational costs of the buildings. Harper graduated its final class of 19 seniors and closed after the 2020–2021 school year on June 30, 2021.

Athletics 
Harper competed in the Chicago Public League (CPL) and was a member of the Illinois High School Association (IHSA). Harper sports teams were nicknamed Cardinals. The boys' basketball team were Class 2A and 3A to become the four time regional champions. (2008–09, 2009–10, 2010–11, 2015–16). The chess team were Class AA only once and finished 8th place. (1975–76). The boys' football team were Class 3A, 4A, 5A and 6A to made team qualifier for state finals twenty-four times. (1984–85, 1985–86, 1986–87, 1990–91, 1992–93, 1993–94, 1994–95, 1995–96, 1996–97, 1997–98, 1998–99, 2000–01, 2001–02, 2002–03, 2003–04, 2004–05, 2005–06, 2007–08, 2008–09, 2010–11, 2011–12, 2012–13, 2013–14, 2014–15). On October 3, 2019, This was Harper's 108th season as a football program and sadly this will be their last as Harper is being closed in Summer 2021.

Notable alumni 
 Cal Lepore – (attended), former NFL referee (1966–1980)
 John Kennedy – (Class of 1959), former MLB baseball player (1962–1974)
 James Meeks – (Class of 1974), founder and senior pastor of Salem Baptist Church, and former Democratic member of the Illinois Senate
 Wayne Smith – (Class of 1975), former NFL football player (1980–1987)

References

External links 
 School website
 Profile from the Illinois High School Association

Public high schools in Chicago
Educational institutions established in 1911
1911 establishments in Illinois
Former high schools in Illinois
2021 disestablishments in Illinois
Educational institutions disestablished in 2021